Steve Prescott is an artist whose work has appeared in role-playing games.

Early life and education
Steve Prescott grew up in Cleveland, Ohio, and he graduated with a BFA in Illustration from Columbus College of Art and Design.

Works
Steve Prescott has produced interior illustrations for many Dungeons & Dragons books and Dragon magazine, as well as cover art for books such as Fortress of the Yuan-Ti. He has also produced artwork for other games such as Paizo Pathfinder, World of Warcraft TCG, Werewolf: The Apocalypse (White Wolf) and Shadowrun (FASA). Most notable, he has worked on the popular collectible card game Magic: The Gathering since 2006 both in card art form as well as conceptual design.

References

External links
 
 Official website

Artists from Cleveland
Columbus College of Art and Design alumni
Living people
Role-playing game artists
Year of birth missing (living people)